Luciogobius pallidus is a species of goby endemic to Japan where it is found in fresh, brackish and marine underground waters near the coasts. This species and its close relative L. albus are the only known cavefish in Japan.

References

pallidus
Freshwater fish of Japan
Endemic fauna of Japan
Cave fish
Taxonomy articles created by Polbot
Fish described in 1940